The East German football champions were the annual winners of the DDR-Oberliga.

History
The 1948 and 1949 East German Champions were determined in a single elimination tournament of three rounds. A nationwide football league, the DDR-Oberliga, was established for the 1949–50 season. The Oberliga was dissolved after the 1990–91 season.

The 1954–55 season was a transitional season and neither was a championship awarded nor were clubs relegated. Due to the transition from a fall-spring to a spring-fall schedule starting with 1956, teams only met each other once from August to December 1955.

In the 1961–62 season the DDR-Oberliga returned from a spring-fall to fall-spring schedule, the teams thus met each other three times. The third meeting was held on neutral ground.

Champions
The performance of various clubs is shown in the following table:

Performances

Performance by club
Clubs are named by the last name they used before the German reunification.

Notes:
 1 Played as part of sports club SC Dynamo Berlin until the founding of BFC Dynamo in 1966. 
 2 Played as  SV Deutsche Volkspolizei Dresden until the founding of SG Dynamo Dresden in 1953. 
 3 In 1953, the club was picked up from Leipzig and moved to East Berlin to play as ZSK Vorwärts Berlin, later known as ASK Vorwärts Berlin and after that FC Vorwärts Berlin. In 1971, the club was picked up and moved again, this time from the capital to Frankfurt an der Oder in Bezirk Frankfurt. The team was known as FC Vorwärts Frankfurt.
 4 Also known as BSG Motor Jena and SC Motor Jena.
 5 Also known as SG Aue, BSG Pneumatik Aue, Zentra Wismut Aue, BSG Wismut Aue and SC Wismut Karl-Marx-Stadt. In 1954, the football department of BSG Wismut Aue was delegated to sports club SC Wismut Karl-Marx-Stadt in Chemnitz. In 1963, SC Wismut Karl-Marx Stadt merged with SC Motor Karl-Marx-Stadt to form SC Karl-Marx-Stadt, and the football department of SC Wismut Karl-Marx-Stadt was moved back to Aue and re-attached to BSG Wismut Aue. After German reunification in 1990, the club was renamed FC Wismut Aue before taking on its current form, FC Erzgebirge Aue in 1993.
 6 Also known as SG Fortuna Erfurt, BSG KWU Erfurt, BSG Turbine Erfurt and SC Turbine Erfurt. In 1966, the football departments of SC Turbine Erfurt and BSG Optima Erfurt were merged under the name FC Rot-Weiß Erfurt.
 7 Also known as SC Lokomotive Leipzig (not to be confused with 1. FC Lokomotive Leipzig) and FC Sachsen Leipzig.
 8 Also known as SG Planitz, ZSG Horch Zwickau and BSG Motor Zwickau.
 9 Also known as ZSG Union Halle.
 10 Also known as SC Empor Rostock.
 11 Also known as SC Rotation Leipzig and SC Leipzig (not to be confused with SC Lokomotive Leipzig).
 12 Also known as SG Freiimfelde Halle.  
 13 Also known as Sportgemeinde Grube Marga , BSG Franz Mehring Grube, BSG Aktivist Ost Brieske  and SC Aktivist Brieske-Senftenberg.
 14 Also known as BSG Waggonbau Dessau and BSG Waggonfabrik Dessau.

Performance by city

See also
FDGB-Pokal
DFV-Supercup
List of German football champions

References

DDR-Oberliga
Football in East Germany
East Germany